The 20th Annual GMA Dove Awards were held on April 13, 1989, recognizing accomplishments of musicians for the year 1988. The show was held in Nashville, Tennessee.

Award recipients
Song of the Year
"Friend Of A Wounded Heart"; Wayne Watson, Claire Cloninger; Word (ASCAP)
Songwriter of the Year
Steven Curtis Chapman
Male Vocalist of the Year
Wayne Watson
Female Vocalist of the Year
Sandi Patty
Group of the Year
Take 6
Artist of the Year
Amy Grant
New Artist of the Year
Take 6
Southern Gospel Album of the Year
Goin' In Style; The Cathedrals; Lari Goss; Homeland
Southern Gospel Recorded Song of the Year
"Champion Of Love"; The Cathedrals; Phil Cross, Caroly Cross; RiverSong
Inspirational Album of the Year
Make His Praise Glorious; Sandi Patty; Greg Nelson, Sandi Patti Helvering*; Word
NOTE:  The legal name was not changed until 1994.
Inspirational Recorded Song of the Year
"In Heaven's Eyes"; Sandi Patty; Phil McHugh; Word
Pop/Contemporary Album of the Year
Lead Me On; Amy Grant; Brown Bannister; Myrrh
Pop/Contemporary Recorded Song of the Year
"His Eyes"; Steven Curtis Chapman; Steven Curtis Chapman; Sparrow
Contemporary Gospel Album of the Year 
Take 6; Take 6; Mark Kibble, Claude V. McKnight III, Mervyn E. Warren; Reprise Records
Contemporary Gospel Recorded Song of the Year
"If We Ever"; Take 6; Public Domain; Reunion
Traditional Gospel Album of the Year
Live...In Chicago; Shirley Caesar; Bubba Smith, Shirley Caesar; Rejoice
Traditional Gospel Recorded Song of the Year (formerly Traditional Black Gospel)
"Hold My Mule"; Shirley Caesar; Shirley Caesar Williams; Word
Country Album of the Year
Richest Man In Town; Bruce Carroll; Bubba Smith; New Canaan
Country Recorded Song of the Year
"Above And Beyond"; Bruce Carroll; Bruce Carroll, Paul Smith; Word
Rock Album of the Year
Russ Taff; Russ Taff; Jack Joseph Puig; Myrrh
Rock Recorded Song of the Year
"Won By One"; Mylon & Broken Heart; Scot Allen, Trent Arganti, Kenneth Bentley, Ben Hewitt, Paul Joseph, Mylon LeFevre, Joe Hardy; Star Song
Hard Music Album of the Year
In God We Trust; Stryper; Stryper, Michael Lloyd; Enigma
Hard Music Recorded Song of the Year
"In God We Trust"; Stryper; Stryper; Benson
Instrumental Album of the Year
A Symphony Of Praise; Sandi Patti; David T Clydesdale; Word
Praise and Worship Album of the Year
Praise 10; Maranatha! Singers; Smitty Price, Tom Coomes; Maranatha!
Children's Music Album of the Year
Wise Guys and Starry Skies; Kathie Hill; Kathie Hill, Randall Dennis; Sparrow
Musical Album
In His Presence, The Ridden King; Dick and Melodie Tunney; Dick and Melodie Tunney; Genevox
Choral Collection Album
Sandi Patty Choral Praise; Greg Nelson; Word Music
Short Form Music Video of the Year
"Lead Me On"; Amy Grant; Tina Silvey; Andrew Doucette; Myrrh
Long Form Music Video of the Year
Carmen Live...Radically Saved; Carman; Cindy Dupree; George J. Flanigen IV and Robert Deaton; Benson
Recorded Music Packaging of the Year
PATRICK POLLEI, JOAN TANKERSLEY; PHILLIP DIXON; Russ Taff; Russ Taff

References

External links
 https://doveawards.com/awards/past-winners/

GMA Dove Awards
1989 music awards
1989 in American music
1989 in Tennessee
GMA